Sylvia Jackson (born 12 June 1945) is a British sprint canoer who competed in the late 1960s. She was eliminated in the semifinals in the K-1 500 m event at the 1968 Summer Olympics in Mexico City.

References
Sports-reference.com profile

1945 births
Canoeists at the 1968 Summer Olympics
Living people
Olympic canoeists of Great Britain
British female canoeists